Sadovy is a rural locality (a settlement) in Vygonichsky District, Bryansk Oblast, Russia. The population was 286 as of 2010. There are 4 streets.

Geography 
Sadovy is located 9 km northeast of Vygonichi (the district's administrative centre) by road. Skryabino is the nearest rural locality.

References 

Rural localities in Vygonichsky District